"Long Trip Alone" is a song co-written and recorded by American country music artist Dierks Bentley. It was released in November 2006 as the second single and title track from his 2006 album of the same name. The song peaked at number 10 on the US Billboard Hot Country Songs chart and at number 66 on the US Billboard Hot 100. Bentley wrote this song with  Steve Bogard and Brett Beavers.

Content
The song's narrator is expressing the need to have a traveling companion in the journey of life.

Music video
The music video was directed by Charles Mehling and premiered in late-2006. It features a man who is walking home after doing time in jail. In the video, Bentley had his famous curls shaved off, when his character was sent off to jail. It was filmed over a 3-day period in Mexico City, Mexico.

Chart performance

Year-end charts

References

2006 singles
2006 songs
Dierks Bentley songs
Songs written by Dierks Bentley
Songs written by Brett Beavers
Capitol Records Nashville singles
Song recordings produced by Brett Beavers
Songs written by Steve Bogard